Falcón Municipality is a municipality in Falcón State, Venezuela.

Settlements
El Hato
El Pozon
Jadacaquiva
La Macolla
Las Carmelitas
Las Cumaraguas
, municipal seat of Falcón Municipality

Municipalities of Falcón